Jozef Maria Raskin (21 June 1892 – 18 October 1943) was a Belgian artist, painter, draftsman, and Scheutist missionary who served in World War I and became a missionary in China from 1920 to 1934.  Later, during World War II, he was drafted into the Belgian army as a chaplain and was a personal advisor to King Leopold III. While operating under the code name Leopold Vindictive 200 for the Belgian resistance, on 1 May 1942 he was arrested by the Gestapo, tried and convicted, and on 18 October 1943 was guillotined.    A statue honoring his service stands in Aarschot. After World War II, a book about Raskin's exploits in both world wars was written by Jozef De Vroey, himself a Catholic priest and survivor of both these conflicts, under the title Pater Raskin in de beide wereldoorlogen (Father Raskin in Both World Wars).

Early life  and education 
Jozef Raskin was born in Stevoort, Belgium, in 1892. He was the eldest son of Amandus and Marie Léonie ( Cleeren). He studied in a college in Sint-Truiden and took his vows in 1910 with the CICM Missionaries, a Catholic religious order widely known as the Scheut Missionaries.

World War I 
After becoming a deacon on 25 July 1914, Raskin was mobilized into the Belgian army where, due to a shortage of uniforms, he continued to wear his cassock. He was captured on the front lines with the Germans giving him an automatic death sentence, as soldiers disguised as priests were suspected of carrying secret documents, but he successfully escaped from his captors. As a front-line soldier and observer of enemy lines, his skills in drawing were particularly noted.

Missionary in China 
After his ordination by the CICM Missionaries on 2 February 1920, he was stationed as a missionary to Inner Mongolia, China, where he became fluent in both the spoken and written Chinese language.  While attached to the Apostolic Vicariate of Xiwanzi there, he taught natural sciences. In February 1934 he returned to Belgium and became a writer for his order.

World War II 
At the outbreak of World War II, Raskin was drafted as a chaplain into the Belgian military. In this role, he was the personal adviser to King Leopold III, and celebrated Mass with the monarch.

Following defeat in the Battle of Belgium, Raskin used the code name "Leopold Vindictive 200" while working for the Dutch resistance. His knowledge of radiography allowed him to eavesdrop on the transmissions between the various Wehrmacht commands occupying Belgium. He also spent much of his time mapping the German positions on the Belgian coast. He worked with MI14 section "d" (the "Secret Pigeon Service") to convey his intelligence reports to England using the birds. Containers carrying the birds would be parachuted to him in occupied Belgium. Although written on ultra thin paper, Raskin wrote in-depth reports which included detailed sketches of enemy positions and up to 5,000-word memos. An example of one such message from Raskin, which was flown to Britain by pigeon, is now archived in the UK's National Archives under the heading "Source Message No.37", it read:

Arrest and execution 
On 1 May 1942, Raskin was betrayed as a spy by a man dressed as a beggar and was arrested by the Gestapo.  While imprisoned awaiting trial, he was described by other prisoners as being "a learned man, uplifting, eloquent, a support and an example" who sang every night, told stories of his years in China, and heard confessions from his fellow inmates. On 31 August 1943 he was tried and convicted, offering as his only defense: Im Gewissen und vor Gott habe ich meine Pflicht getan (In conscience and before God I have done my duty). The following day, 1 September 1943, he was sentenced to death and on 18 October 1943, at 1843 hours, he was guillotined in Dortmund Prison.

He was buried in Stevoort.

Memorial
A statue was erected in his honor in Aarschot.

References

Bibliography 
  Pater M.-J. Raskin (memorial edition). Davidsfonds: Stevoort-Wijer, 1993
  Pater Raskin in de beide wereldoorlogen, J. de Vroey, Hertogelijke Aarschotse Kring voor Heemkunde, 1992.
  De eeuw van de ekster. Een Belgisch levensverhaal, Brigitte Raskin, Amsterdam: Meulenhoff, 1994.

External links
 Jozef Raskin in ODIS - Online Database for Intermediary Structures 

1892 births
1943 deaths
Belgian civilians killed in World War II
Belgian military personnel killed in World War II
Belgian Army personnel of World War I
Belgian military personnel of World War II
Belgian Roman Catholic missionaries
20th-century Belgian Roman Catholic priests
Belgian sinologists
People from Hasselt
Roman Catholic missionaries in China
Belgian expatriates in China
Belgian people executed by Nazi Germany
People executed by Nazi Germany by guillotine
Belgian resistance members
Missionary linguists
Belgian prisoners of war
World War I prisoners of war held by Germany
Belgian escapees
Escapees from German detention